Widdrington Station and Stobswood is a civil parish in the county of Northumberland, England. It includes the settlements of Widdrington Station and Stobswood.

History

Etymology
As the name suggests, Widdrington Station has a railway station.  This is on the East Coast Main Line.

Geography

The soil is a strong clay, producing fine crops of wheat and beans, and the surface is generally level, rising more steeply to  AOD to the far west of the parish and with a gentle elevation towards the old village, which commands extensive views in every direction, and the area around which formerly abounded in wood.  On the horizon from here is the sea.  Fields are extensively farmed, some of which are pasture, and there are remains to the west of a quarry of freestone, active in 1848. The population is spread over a large area with a density of approximately 0.7 persons per hectare which is average across the entire region.

Education
Widdrington's educational provision includes a state-assisted first school, voluntary controlled by the local Church of England ecclesiastical parish, supported by the Diocese.

Localities

Stobswood
Stobswood has a population of around 120. The majority of the housing in Stobswood was built in support of the railway and the defunct brickworks that previously operated just to the east of the railway line. Stobswood Miners Welfare is the local pub for Stobswood, which hosts two Saturday football teams, Stobswood Welfare A.F.C and a newly formed Stobswood Welfare A.F.C Reserve team. It also hosts 3 Senior Cricket teams, 2 sides playing on a Saturday and a midweek side playing on a Thursday, all playing in the Northumberland & Tyneside Cricket League.

Local Government 
Widdrington Station and Stobswood lie within the Ulgham ward of the county-wide unitary county, Northumberland.  Its county councillor is Cllr David J. Towns (Conservative) and the villages fall within the Druridge Bay Community Forum and the Northern Area Committee jurisdictions of the Council.

Transport 

Roads
Both are north–south routes, with the dualled route heading north being the A1.

Trains
A morning and evening train stops in each direction allowing commuting if working relatively long days to Morpeth or Newcastle with a journey time respectively of: 9 minutes and 31–35 minutes.  

Buses
An express bus route, the X18 connects to the town centres of Newcastle, Morpeth to the south via the village to four to the north: Amble, Walkworth, Alnmouth, Alnwick.

Other bus routes are the:
20/X20, from Ashington and Lynemouth via the village to four northern towns mentioned.
1 which starts here and connects nearby Cresswell on Druridge Bay, then continuing to the coastal town of Blyth, via Ashington.

All three are operated by Arriva.

See also 
Woodhorn
Druridge Bay
Ulgham
 James Bulmer Johnson - local resident who won the Victoria Cross

References

External links

General description Morpeth Today
Local Plan Northumbria County Council
 for Widdrington Station
 for Stobswood
GENUKI local and family history (accessed: 10 November 2008)	
Northumberland Communities (accessed: 10 November 2008)

Civil parishes in Northumberland